Daniele Pace (20 April 1935 – 24 October 1985) was an Italian composer, lyricist and singer-songwriter.

Life and career 
Born in Milan, Pace started his career as lead vocalist of the group  I Marcellini. After a brief solo career as a singer-songwriter, in the early 1960s he was enrolled by CGD as a composer and lyricist, often teaming with Mario Panzeri. The duo had several hits, and some of their songs were covered in other languages and became international successes. In 1971 he co-founded the comedy music group Squallor, and in 1979 he recorded a solo album, Vitamina C.

Pace's collaborations include Gigliola Cinquetti, France Gall, Caterina Caselli, Ricchi e Poveri, Loredana Bertè, Roberto Carlos, Orietta Berti, Mario Lavezzi, I Camaleonti, Eduardo De Crescenzo, Connie Francis and Massimo Ranieri. He died of a heart attack, aged 50.

References

External links 
 
 
 Daniele Pace at Discogs
 

1935 births
1985 deaths
20th-century Italian composers
Musicians from Milan
Italian comedy musicians
Lyricists
Italian lyricists
Italian male singer-songwriters
20th-century Italian male singers
20th-century Italian comedians